This is a list of convenience shops in the United Kingdom.

History
In mid-September 2015 Booker Group announced it would acquire Musgrave Retail Partners GB, owner of the Londis and Budgens brands for £40m, adding Londis's 1,630 convenience shops and 167 Budgens franchise outlets to its estate.

In December 2016, McColl's announced it would acquire 298 former Co-op shops

In August 2017, Sainsbury's announced it had entered exclusive talks to acquire Nisa, however talks were abandoned in August due to concerns over monopoly and competition inquiries. It was then announced that the Co-operative Group has entered talks to acquire Nisa. In November, the Co-op announced that the Nisa board had recommended members accept the Co-op's £140m offer for the company. In 2022, McColl's was placed in voluntary administration and purchased by Morrisons.

Current

Defunct

See also
List of supermarket chains in the United Kingdom
List of convenience stores

References

 
 
Retail
United Kingdom